The Talhouët family is a noble family from the Duchy of Brittany, originating in the 15th century.

Members

Marquises of Talhouët
Louis Céleste de Talhouët-Bonamour (Rennes, 5 October 1761 - Paris Ier arrondissement, 5 March 1812), marquis of Talhouët and marquis of Acigné, lord of Québriac, lieutenant in the king's infantry (27 April 1788), marquis of Talhouët, count of the Empire, member and president of the electoral college of Sarthe.
Auguste-Frédéric de Talhouët (1788-1842), marquis of Talhouët, maréchal de camp, peer of France.
Auguste de Talhouët-Roy (1819-1884), marquis of Talhouët, deputy, senator, minister

Notes

Sources
  

French noble families
History of Brittany